Jimmy Staten IV (born May 4, 1991) is a former American football defensive end. He was drafted by the Seattle Seahawks in the fifth round of the 2014 NFL Draft. He played college football at Middle Tennessee.

High school career
Staten attended Ware County High School in Waycross, Georgia. As a senior in 2008, he amassed 87 tackles, as well as lettering in track and field and making the shot put state finals. He earned all-state (and All-Region 2-AAAA) honors his junior and senior years. He received scholarship offers from seven NCAA Division I schools, including Auburn, Clemson, and South Carolina, but ultimately decided to play for Rick Stockstill and the Middle Tennessee State Blue Raiders.

College career
After redshirting the 2009 season, he played in 13 games in the 2010 season, playing 189 snaps and recording five tackles. The following season, Staten was given more playing time. He started in all 12 games, and in 615 snaps he racked up 29 tackles, fourj tackles for loss and a sack. While starting all 12 games in the 2012 season, Staten finished the year with 36 tackles, 1.5 tackles for loss, a sack and a QB hurry in 535 snaps. 

In 2013, Staten was voted the team captain for the Blue Raiders. In his 12 games and 467 snaps, he recorded 30 tackles, 1.5 tackles for loss, a pass breakup and two QB hurries in his final season. He earned All-Conference USA honorable mention honors after the season.

Professional career

2014 Draft
After being projected as a seventh round pick or free agent, Staten was selected by the Seattle Seahawks in the fifth round (172nd overall) of the 2014 NFL Draft. Staten was sitting in his college graduation ceremony at Murphy Center when he received the phone call from Seattle indicating that they were going to draft him.

Seattle Seahawks
Staten was signed to a rookie contract with Seattle on May 16, 2014. On August 17, 2015, he was waived by the Seahawks.

New York Giants
On August 19, 2015, Staten was claimed off waivers by the New York Giants. On September 1, 2015, he was waived by the Giants.

New England Patriots
On September 7, 2015, the New England Patriots signed Staten to their practice squad. On September 16, 2015, he was released by the Patriots. He was re-signed to the practice squad on September 18.

Kansas City Chiefs
On September 30, 2015, Staten was signed to the Kansas City Chiefs' practice squad. On January 18, 2016, the Chiefs signed Staten to a future/reserve contract. On September 3, 2016, he was released by the Chiefs.

Chicago Bears
On September 14, 2016, Staten was signed to the Bears' practice squad. He was promoted to the active roster on November 19, 2016 but was released two days later and re-signed to the practice squad. He was released on December 27, 2016.

Atlanta Falcons
On January 17, 2017, Staten was signed to the Falcons' practice squad. He signed a reserve/future contract with the Falcons on February 7, 2017. On April 26, 2017, Staten was waived the Falcons.

Tennessee Titans
On May 15, 2017, Staten was signed by the Tennessee Titans. He was waived/injured on September 2, 2017 and placed on injured reserve. He was released on September 11, 2017.

References

External links
 Middle Tennessee Blue Raiders bio
 Seattle Seahawks profile

1991 births
Living people
People from Ware County, Georgia
Players of American football from Georgia (U.S. state)
American football defensive tackles
Middle Tennessee Blue Raiders football players
Seattle Seahawks players
New York Giants players
New England Patriots players
Kansas City Chiefs players
Chicago Bears players
Atlanta Falcons players
Tennessee Titans players